The Mosque of Abu Bakr al-'Aydarus or Aidrus Mosque is a Sufi mosque in Aidrus Street in Crater, Aden Governorate, Yemen. One of the principal mosques in Aden, it is named after Abu Bakr al-Aydarus, the wali of Aden.

Originally built in the late-15th or early-16th century, the mosque  underwent rebuilding after being destroyed in 1859. During the 1994 civil war in Yemen, Islamic fundamentalists from North Yemen damaged much of the mosque, burning copies of the Quran and vandalizing tombs in its courtyard.

The mosque is featured on some Aden postage stamps, e.g. the 1938 2 anna stamp.

See also
 List of mosques in Yemen

References

Buildings and structures in Aden
Mosques in Yemen